The Guava River rises just north of the Grand Ridge of the Blue Mountains on the border of Portland Parish in Jamaica. From here it runs east then north and then east again to its confluence with the Rio Grande.

 there are no roads or settlements visible anywhere along the river's length on satellite imagery or on the earlier maps.

See also
List of rivers of Jamaica

References

Ford, Jos C. and Finlay, A.A.C. (1908).The Handbook of Jamaica. Jamaica Government Printing Office

External links
Aerial view of the source of the Guava river
Aerial view of the mouth of the Guava river

Rivers of Jamaica